Jon Chol (born 12 April 1982) is a North Korean former footballer. He represented North Korea on at least thirteen occasions between 2001 and 2007.

Career statistics

International

References

1982 births
Living people
North Korean footballers
North Korea international footballers
Association football midfielders